Khardaha railway station is a Kolkata Suburban Railway station in the town of Khardaha. It serves the local areas of Khardaha and as well as Rahara in North 24 Parganas district, West Bengal, India. This railway station is well connected towards south with Sealdah (Station code: SDAH), which is one of India's major railway terminal serving the city of Kolkata. Towards north, it is well connected with some Big Railway Junctions like Barrackpore, Naihati, Bandel and Barddhaman. This station is under jurisdiction of Eastern Railway zone of Indian Railways. Khardaha Railway Station comes under Seladah-Ranaghat Main line. Only EMU train service is available from here at present.

History
The Sealdah–Kusthia line of the Eastern Bengal Railway was opened to railway traffic in the year 1862. Eastern Bengal Railway used to work only on the eastern side of the Hooghly River.

Station complex
The platform is not very well sheltered. It has many facilities including water and sanitation. It is well connected to the BT Road. But there is no proper approach road to this station.

Electrification
The Sealdah–Ranaghat sector was electrified in 1963–65.

References

External links

 

Sealdah railway division
Railway stations in North 24 Parganas district
Transport in Kolkata
Kolkata Suburban Railway stations